Probable G-protein coupled receptor 151 is a protein that in humans is encoded by the GPR151 gene.

References

Further reading

G protein-coupled receptors